"(Live May Be) A Big Insanity" is a 1990 pop song performed by German singer Sandra, written by Michael Cretu and Klaus Hirschburger, and produced by Cretu. It was released in spring 1990 as the second single from Sandra's fourth studio album, Paintings in Yellow. The single became only a moderate hit in Germany and France.

The music video for the song was directed by Howard Greenhalgh. The clip was released on Sandra's VHS video compilation 18 Greatest Hits in 1992 and the 2003 DVD The Complete History.

Formats and track listings
 7" single
A. "(Life May Be) A Big Insanity" – 4:29
B. "The Skin I'm In" – 3:40

 12" single
A1. "(Life May Be) A Big Insanity" (Radio Edit) – 4:29
A2. "(Life May Be) A Big Insanity" (Club Mix) – 6:12
B1. "(Life May Be) A Big Insanity" (Dance Mix) – 6:39
B2. "(Life May Be) A Big Insanity" (Dub Mix) – 2:33

 CD maxi single
 "(Life May Be) A Big Insanity" (Radio Edit) – 4:29
 "(Life May Be) A Big Insanity" (Club Mix) – 6:12
 "(Life May Be) A Big Insanity" (Dance Mix) – 6:39
 "(Life May Be) A Big Insanity" (Dub Mix) – 2:33
 "The Skin I'm In" (Single Version) – 3:40

Charts

References

External links
 "(Life May Be) A Big Insanity" at Discogs

1990 singles
1990 songs
Sandra (singer) songs
Song recordings produced by Michael Cretu
Songs written by Klaus Hirschburger
Songs written by Michael Cretu
Virgin Records singles
Music videos directed by Howard Greenhalgh